The Harvard Educational Review is an academic journal of opinion and research dealing with education, associated with the Harvard Graduate School of Education, and published by the Harvard Education Publishing Group. The journal was established in 1930.

Since 1945, editorial decisions have been carried out by an autonomous graduate student editorial board. This student board works together to bring to publication manuscripts on a wide range of topics and from a number of disciplines.

Alumni
Notable alumni of the Harvard Educational Review include:
Lisa Delpit, educationalist and MacArthur Fellow
Eve L. Ewing, sociologist, author, poet, and visual artist
Sara Lawrence-Lightfoot, educational sociologist and MacArthur Fellow
Orval Hobart Mowrer, psychologist and former president of the American Psychological Association
Lauren Resnick, educational psychologist
Theodore Sizer, educationalist and founder of the Coalition of Essential Schools
Julian Stanley, psychologist and founder of the Center for Talented Youth

External links

Harvard University academic journals
Education journals
Publications established in 1930
English-language journals
Quarterly journals
Academic journals edited by students